Tuojiang Town is an ancient town and the seat of Fenghuang County in Hunan, China. The town has 29 villages and 7 communities under its jurisdiction, its seat is at Fenghuang South Road. The town is famous for Ancient City of Fenghuang, it is one of the most important tourist destinations in Hunan and one of AAAA-rated tourist attractions.

History
The town of Tuojiang is an ancient town. it was City of Wuzhaisi which was the seat of Wuzhai Tusi formed in Yuan dynasty. Camp Fenghuang was established there in 1704 and Camp Fenghuang was upgraded to Military Department of Fenghuang in 1736, it became the seat of Fenghuang Military Department. Military Department of Fenghuang ceased to be a military unit, the county of Fenghuang was formed in 1912, it is the seat of the county. In 1942, the town of Zhengan was renamed as Tuojiang after the Tuojiang River which runs through it.

Amalgamation of villages in 2016

Geography
The town of Tuojiang is located in the east of Fenghuang County, it is bordered by the township of Dashuitian to the south, by the towns of Liaojiaqiao and Qiangongping to the west, by the towns of Jinxin and Mujiangping to the north, by the townships of Shiyangzui and Banlishu of Mayang County to the east.

Subdivisions
The township of Guanzhuang was merged to the town, it had 7 communities and 34 villages under its jurisdiction in 2015. Through the amalgamation of village-level divisions in 2016, its villages were reduced to 29 from 34, the town of Tuojiang has 29 villages and 7 communities under its jurisdiction.

7 communities
 Chengbei Community
 Gucheng Community
 Hongqi Community
 Nanhua Community
 Sanwangge Community
 Shawan Community
 Xintianlong Community

29 villages
 Baiyan Village
 Bisheng Village
 Changping Village
 Da'ao Village
 Dahuangtu Village
 Dawan Village
 Dazhong Village
 Dongfanghong Village
 Dutian Village
 Duye Village
 Guangzhuang Village
 Hongqiao Village
 Huangli Village
 Jinping Village
 Longtan Village
 Mianzhai Village
 Mulinqiao Village
 Pingli Village
 Qiliangqiao Village
 Qingwa Village
 Sanliwan Village
 Shilipai Village
 Shucai Village
 Tuqiao Village
 Wanzhao Village
 Xiaohuangtu Village
 Xikou Village
 Xinmin Village
 Zhuangshang Village

Attractions
The town of Tuojiang is one of national famous historical and cultural cities in China, the Miaojiang Great Wall, hanging houses, ancient architectural complex and two national historical and cultural sites of Old Fortress of Fenghuang and Shen Congwen's Former Residence are important tourist attractions.

References

Fenghuang County
County seats in Hunan
AAAA-rated tourist attractions
Towns of Xiangxi Tujia and Miao Autonomous Prefecture